The Minkowski content (named after Hermann Minkowski), or the boundary measure, of a set is a basic concept that uses concepts from geometry and measure theory to generalize the notions of length of a smooth curve in the plane, and area of a smooth surface in space, to arbitrary measurable sets. 

It is typically applied to fractal boundaries of domains in the Euclidean space, but it can also be used in the context of general metric measure spaces.

It is related to, although different from, the Hausdorff measure.

Definition

and the m-dimensional lower Minkowski content is defined as

If the upper and lower m-dimensional Minkowski content of A are equal, then their common value is called the Minkowski content Mm(A).

Properties 
 The Minkowski content is (generally) not a measure.  In particular, the m-dimensional Minkowski content in Rn is not a measure unless m = 0, in which case it is the counting measure.  Indeed, clearly the Minkowski content assigns the same value to the set A as well as its closure.
 If A is a closed m-rectifiable set in Rn, given as the image of a bounded set from Rm under a Lipschitz function, then the m-dimensional Minkowski content of A exists, and is equal to the m-dimensional Hausdorff measure of A.

See also 
 Gaussian isoperimetric inequality
 Geometric measure theory
 Isoperimetric inequality in higher dimensions
 Minkowski–Bouligand dimension

Footnotes

References 
 .
 .

Measure theory
Geometry
Analytic geometry
Dimension theory
Dimension
Measures (measure theory)
Fractals
Hermann Minkowski